Corvette Forum is an auto enthusiast website for owners and fans of the Chevrolet Corvette sports car. The site is widely considered the largest Corvette enthusiasts' club – online or offline – in the world.

History
Corvette Forum was launched in 1999 by Troy Roberts and Ryan Adams, two Corvette enthusiasts; the site is not directly affiliated with General Motors.

The site grew to 110,000 registered members by 2006.  In July 2009, memberships numbered 220,000 and the site's discussion forum contained more than 30 million posts, according to the site's discussion forum home page.

CorvetteForum was acquired by Internet Brands in 2007.

Site Usage
Topics include restoration tips, service and repair advice, aftermarket product discussions, and Corvette news.

Discussions cover Corvettes of every year and model, ranging from the first Corvettes produced in 1953 to current models and speculation about future models. Corvette discussion is very restricted as per their guidelines “linking to other Corvette sites is not permitted. Neither is linking to non-supporting vendors or other commercial sites”.
The site also includes a small online marketplace.

The group used to hold a "Cruise In" at the National Corvette Museum in Bowling Green, Kentucky, for an annual meet-up event that raised money for the museum. That was cancelled after the last cruise was held in 2010 when the forum administrator chose St. Jude's over the National Corvette Museum as its charity of choice.

Charitable Causes
CorvetteForum has held an annual fund raiser to support St. Jude Children's Research Hospital since 2003. The community has raised a total of $854,601 as of 2015.

References

Automotive websites
Chevrolet Corvette